An innocence commission is a legal commission set up by a government for post-conviction review of cases, to try to ensure that wrongful convictions do not stand and that no innocent person is executed.

History

In November 2002 Chief Justice I. Beverly Lake Jr. of the North Carolina State Supreme Court established the Criminal Justice Study Commission following several highly publicized exoneration cases in the state. It reviewed police and prosecution procedures for factors that contributed to wrongful convictions. The group recommended reforms, including changes to the procedure for gaining eyewitness testimony. This resulted in a change to state law.

As a result of recommendations of the Justice Study, in 2006 the North Carolina legislature passed a bill to establish a state independent Innocence Inquiry Commission, signed into law by Governor Mike Easley. It was the first U.S. state to do so. The Innocence Commission was developed to review credible post-conviction cases in which the defendants and their advocates claim wrongful conviction; it started operating in 2007 and has exonerated 10 people as of March 2017.

The commission was authorized after some high-profile convictions were overturned. These cases had generated considerable controversy and the exonerations were damaging to even before their convictions were overturned.

The states of Pennsylvania, California, Connecticut, Wisconsin, and Illinois have since created similar innocence commissions.

The law is modeled after one that established the Innocence Network of the United Kingdom.

Process

North Carolina
Defense attorneys apply to the commission to have their clients cases reviewed. The eight-member commission selects which cases to review. Its recommendations are reviewed by a three-judge panel.

Appointment Process

North Carolina
The eight Commission members are appointed by the chief justice of the state Supreme Court and chief judge of the state Court of Appeals.

Other solutions
 Creation of panels to review and improve legal process

References

External links
  "Rules and Procedures of NC Innocence Inquiry Commission", NC Innocence Inquiry Commission 
 Innocence Network UK
 Easley signs innocence commission into N.C. law, Charlotte Observer
 Injustice victims given new chance
 "Injustice network to be launched", BBC
 Pioneering conference on miscarriages of justice, Bristol News, 2004

Public inquiries